HMS Opal was an  of the Royal Navy, laid down as Magicienne by William Doxford & Sons Ltd, Sunderland and launched on 9 March 1875.

She was completed with an armament of 14 muzzle-loading 64-pounder rifled guns (2 as bow and stern chasers mounted on centre-line swivelling slides, and 12 on broadside slide mountings) and initially commenced service on the Pacific Station, and while on passage in 1876 hit a rock in the Strait of Magellan. She was damaged and repairs were undertaken at Esquimalt. She returned to England in 1880 for refit, in which her broadside armament was reduced by 2 guns and she was re-rigged as a barque.

She sailed for service on the Cape of Good Hope and West Africa Station in 1883. En route she arrived at Limbe, Cameroon on 19 July 1884, she was carrying the British Consul for the Bights of Benin and Biafra, Edward Hyde Hewett on his mission to claim the Victoria area (the Cameroon) for Britain. He arrived and planted his flag too late, as Gustav Nachtigal had already raised the German flag at Douala a few days earlier on 14 July 1884.

She then commenced service on the Australia Station in 1885. She returned to England in 1890 and was placed into reserve. She was sold for breaking up at Sheerness in August 1892.

Citations

References
Bastock, John (1988), Ships on the Australia Station, Child & Associates Publishing Pty Ltd; Frenchs Forest, Australia. 
 

 

1875 ships
Ships built on the River Wear
Emerald-class corvettes